Farewell Album is the final album released by The New Seekers in their early 1970s hit-making line up, released in 1974. It is also the group's last release on Polydor Records.

Overview 
In early 1974, despite being at the peak of their success, both female members Eve Graham and Lyn Paul had expressed their wish to leave the group. This was against the terms of their contract (which allowed for only one member to leave at a time), so came the announcement that the group were to split entirely. They released another single and album (both top 20 hits) before they performed their final shows in May.

They had however recorded a number of songs for Polydor before their disbanding and the label issued these as Farewell Album in August 1974 - three months after the group had ended. Two of the twelve tracks had been earlier recordings however. One single was released from the album, called "Sing Hallelujah". The single stalled outside the official top 50 in the UK at No.65, and as the album received no promotion from the group, it similarly failed to chart. Farewell Album received a favourable review from Disc magazine, commenting on the fact that 10 of the 12 tracks feature female leads, while member Marty Kristian features on lead for just two of the songs.

Track listing 
Side One
 "Sing Hallelujah" (Keith Potger, Tony Macaulay)
 "Inspiration" (Paul Williams, Kenneth Ascher)
 "All I Wanna Do" (Shifrin)
 "Everybody's Song" (Marty Kristian)
 "Somebody Warm Like Me" (Tony Macaulay)
 "Old Fashioned Song" (Oliver)
Side Two
 "All Pull Together Kind of World" (Tony Macaulay, Geoff Stephens)
 "Love and Sunshine" (Oliver)
 "Perfect Love" (Paul Williams)
 "I Wanna Be the Star of the Show" (Mackay, Trevor Peacock)
 "Sad Song" (Marty Kristian)
 "Oh My Joe" (Tony Macaulay, Roger Greenaway)

Personnel 
Eve Graham - Vocals
Lyn Paul - Vocals
 Marty Kristian - Guitar, vocals
 Paul Layton - Bass, backing vocals
 Peter Oliver - Guitar, backing vocals
 Tony Macaulay and Tommy Oliver - Production
 David Mackay - Production on tracks 9 and 10
 Recorded at Wessex Sound Studios, Sarm Studios, Indigo Sound Studios, Central Sound Studios & IBC Studios

References 

1974 albums
The New Seekers albums
Albums produced by David Mackay (producer)
Polydor Records albums